William Jenkinson may refer to:
 William Jenkinson (footballer, born 1892) (1892–1967), English footballer for Liverpool and Wigan Borough
 William Jenkinson (footballer, born 1883) (1883–?), English footballer for Gainsborough Trinity
 Bill Jenkinson (1874–1960), English footballer for Burnley and West Ham United